Toxopneustes maculatus is a rare species of sea urchin found in the Indo-West Pacific.

Taxonomy
Toxopneustes maculatus is one of the four species in the genus Toxopneustes. It belongs to the family Toxopneustidae in the order Camarodonta. It was  originally described as Echinus maculatus by the French naturalist Jean-Baptiste Lamarck in 1816, in the second book of his Histoire naturelle des animaux sans vertèbres series. The generic name Toxopneustes literally means "poison breath", derived from Greek τοξικόν [φάρμακον] (toksikón [phármakon], "arrow [poison]") and πνευστος (pneustos, "breath"). The specific name maculatus means "spotted" in Latin.

Description
The appearance of living specimens is unknown, but like other flower urchins, it probably has prominent pedicellariae. It is only known from empty  "shells" (tests). The tests have a distinctive color pattern with a large bright purple blotch around the entirety of the bottom surface as well as a bright blue-violet band around the middle.

Distribution
Toxopneustes maculatus has a range probably as large as that of the more common Toxopneustes pileolus, but it is exceedingly rare. It is known only from a few specimens recovered from Réunion, Christmas Island, unspecified areas of the Indian Ocean, and the Palmyra Atoll.

See also
Fire urchins

References 

Toxopneustidae
Fauna of the Indian Ocean
Fauna of the Pacific Ocean
Animals described in 1816
Taxa named by Jean-Baptiste Lamarck